Matt Everitt is an American animator and visual effects artist. He was nominated for an Academy Award in the category Best Visual Effects for the film Love and Monsters.

Selected filmography 
 Love and Monsters (2020; co-nominated with Matt Sloan, Genevieve Camilleri and Brian Cox)

References

External links 

Living people
Place of birth missing (living people)
Year of birth missing (living people)
Visual effects artists
American animators